is the 12th single by Japanese music trio Candies. Written by Rei Nakanishi and Takashi Miki, the single was released on November 21, 1976. The song appeared on their 1977 album Candies 11/2: Yasashii Akuma. An earlier version of this song, appears on a special edition of their compilation album Candies: Time Capsule.

The song peaked at No. 12 on Oricon's singles chart and sold over 288,000 copies.

Track listing

Chart positions

References

External links 
 
 

1976 singles
1976 songs
Japanese-language songs
Candies (group) songs
Sony Music Entertainment Japan singles